Grace Under Pressure is the tenth studio album by Canadian rock band Rush, released April 12, 1984 on Anthem Records. After touring for the band's previous album, Signals (1982), came to an end in mid-1983, Rush started work on a follow-up in August. The band had decided to not work with longtime producer Terry Brown, who had collaborated with Rush since 1974. The new material accentuated the group's change in direction towards a synthesizer-oriented sound like its previous album. After some difficulty finding a suitable producer who could commit, the album was recorded with Peter Henderson.

Grace Under Pressure reached number 4 in Canada, number 5 in the UK, and number 10 on the U.S. Billboard 200.  It was certified platinum in the U.S. for selling one million copies.

Background and recording
In July 1983, Rush ended its 1982–1983 tour of North America and the UK in support of its previous album, Signals (1982). The group reconvened in mid-August to write and rehearse new material for a follow-up in a lodge in Horseshoe Valley in Barrie, Ontario. The sessions were productive, partly due to the set amount of time they gave themselves to work in and that studio time had already been booked. The band adopted its usual working method of Geddy Lee and Alex Lifeson working on music while Neil Peart worked on lyrics. News stories from the Toronto-based newspaper The Globe and Mail inspired some of the lyrics on the album, particularly "Distant Early Warning," "Red Lenses" and "Between the Wheels." Peart wrote that they came up with "Between the Wheels" on the first night and, after a few days, "Kid Gloves" and "Afterimage." In three weeks, the group had assembled a demo tape of the aforementioned tracks along with "Red Sector A" and "The Body Electric." Development then paused in September 1983 while Rush performed five nights at Radio City Music Hall in New York City, after which the band resumed album rehearsals.

Grace Under Pressure is the first Rush album that was not produced by Terry Brown since its 1974 debut effort. At the beginning of the Signals tour in April 1982, Rush met with Brown in Miami to inform him that the band had decided to work with a different producer. The group wished to explore different approaches and techniques that someone else might offer which in turn would develop their sound but stressed that the change did not suggest any dissatisfaction in Brown's production. Peart recalled that the split was tough for both parties considering the length of time they had worked together, but that they split on good terms. Brown receives a tribute in the liner notes of Grace Under Pressure in French which translates to "And always our good old friend."

The search for a new producer began during Rush's 1983 European tour, where the band met several candidates during their visit to the UK. They met Steve Lillywhite, who initially agreed to the project, but he backed out two weeks before the band was to start rehearsing, as he'd decided to work with Simple Minds instead. They had Yes bassist Chris Squire and singer and producer Trevor Horn, who sang on Yes' 1980 album Drama, attend their concert at Wembley Arena with the prospect of choosing one of them to produce. Eventually, the group started pre-production alone, which Peart thought increased the band's desire to succeed: "This really drew us together and gave us a strong resolve and a mutual determination to make a really great record." Rush then met with another English producer during rehearsals who showed promise, but various problems that hindered his availability could not be solved in time. This was followed by the arrival of Englishman Peter Henderson, who the band liked and who agreed to produce and engineer, but his occasional indecisiveness ultimately left the band to handle the majority of the creative decisions themselves. Despite this, Rush and Henderson are credited as co-producers in the liner notes.

After a collection of demos had been worked out, the group entered Le Studio in Morin-Heights, Quebec to record, from November 1983 to March 1984, the longest period Rush had taken to record an album up to this point. The band spent up to 14 hours per day in the studio. In a 1984 interview, Lifeson picked Grace Under Pressure as the "most satisfying of all our records."

The album's title was inspired by a quotation from American novelist Ernest Hemingway. Peart was an avid reader and admirer of Hemingway, and liked the quotation "courage is grace under pressure" as he thought the quote reflected the ambient mood of the album's recording sessions.

A music video produced for "The Enemy Within" would be the first played by the Canadian music television channel MuchMusic, which launched in August 1984.

Music

Style
Musically, the album marks yet another development in Rush's sound; while continuing to make extensive use of keyboard synthesizers as on Signals, the band also experimented by incorporating elements of ska and reggae into some of the songs. The guitars played a larger role on this record than on Signals, with Lifeson stating, "I think the guitar on Signals took a bit of a back seat. The keyboards were really upfront ... though in a sense that's what we were trying to achieve, we wanted to go for a different perspective on the whole sound. But, possibly, we lost direction at times on Signals." Lifeson also pointed out that there is no acoustic guitar on Grace Under Pressure and the lack of ballad type songs.

Songs
"The Body Electric" features a guitar solo with an added harmonizing effect with a delay which Lifeson described as "pretty bizarre."

"Afterimage" was written about Robbie Whelan, a tape operator at Le Studio who was killed in a car accident a year prior to the album's release. The album was dedicated to his memory.

Artwork
The cover was designed and painted by Hugh Syme, the creator of all Rush album cover artwork since 1975. The back cover features a band portrait by Armenian-Canadian photographer Yousuf Karsh. The group had decided to employ Karsh when they discussed ideas for the album's sleeve during rehearsals in Horseshoe Valley. Lifeson suggested to Peart a black-and-white band photograph, as the band had not done something like that on previous albums. Lee was enthusiastic towards the idea and suggested to use Karsh. Lifeson spoke of the end result: "It's definitely not a rock 'n' roll picture, but it's a very true, realistic picture of the three of us." The original vinyl pressing also featured a photo depicting an egg being held in a C-clamp.

Release and reception

Grace Under Pressure was released in April 1984. It reached No. 4 in Canada, No. 5 in the UK, and No. 10 on the U.S. Billboard 200.  It was certified platinum in the U.S. for selling one million copies.

Rush filmed promotional videos for "Distant Early Warning," "Afterimage," "The Body Electric" and "The Enemy Within."

Guitar World magazine placed the album on their list of "New Sensations: 50 Iconic Albums That Defined 1984".

Reissues

Track listing

Personnel
Rush
Geddy Lee – bass guitar, synthesizers, vocals, production
Alex Lifeson – guitars, synthesizers, production
Neil Peart – drums, percussion, electronic percussion, production

Production
Peter Henderson – production, engineer
Frank Opolko - engineering assistant
Robert Di Gioia – engineering assistant
Jon Erikson – pre-production engineer
Paul Northfield – PPG synthesizer programming assistance
Jim Burgess – PPG synthesizer programming assistance
Moon Records – executive production
Hugh Syme – art direction, cover painting
Yousuf Karsh – portrait

Charts

Weekly charts

Year-end charts

Singles
"The Body Electric" #56 in the United Kingdom

Certifications

See also
Grace Under Pressure Tour (audio-only releases)
Grace Under Pressure Tour Video

References

External links
 

1984 albums
Rush (band) albums
Anthem Records albums
Atlantic Records albums
Epic Records albums
Mercury Records albums
Sony Music Entertainment Japan albums
Vertigo Records albums
Albums recorded at Le Studio